From Shadows Came Darkness is  metal band Mendeed's third EP release.

Track listing
"Hope Lies in The Heart of Even the Darkest Soul"
"Act of Sorrow"
"Blood Laced Tears"
"Ignite the Flames"
"Fatal Poison Whisper"
"Perpetual Sin"
"Glory Be Thy Name"

Personnel
Dave Proctor - Vocals
Steve Nixon - Lead Guitar
Steph Gildea - Rhythm Guitar
Chris Lavery - Bass, Vocals, Backing Vocals
Kevin Mathews - Drums
Additional Vocals on tracks 2, 4, 6 provided by Sarah Jane
Produced, Engineered and mixed by Mark Daghorn
Mastered by Nigel Palmer at Lowland Masters.
Recorded at New Rising Studios, Peldon, Essex and The Chapel, South Thoresby, Lincolnshire
Mixed at New Rising Studios

Mendeed albums
2004 debut albums